Conasprella hivana is a species of sea snail, a marine gastropod mollusk in the family Conidae, the cone snails and their allies.

Description
The length of the shell attains 16 mm.

Distribution
This species occurs in the Pacific Ocean off the Marquesas.

References

 Moolenbeek R.G., Zandbergen A. & Bouchet P. (2008) Conus (Gastropoda, Conidae) from the Marquesas Archipelago: description of a new endemic offshore fauna. Vita Malacologica 6: 19–34-page(s): 30

External links
 Gastropods.com: Gladioconus hivanus
 MNHN, Paris : holotype

hivana
Gastropods described in 2008